Commissioner is a 1994 Indian Malayalam-language neo-noir action thriller film directed by Shaji Kailas, written by Ranji Panicker, and produced by M. Mani. It stars Suresh Gopi as police commissioner Bharathchandran IPS, and also features Ratheesh, Shobana, Vijayaraghavan, M. G. Soman, Rajan P. Dev, K. B. Ganesh Kumar, N. F. Varghese, Karamana Janardanan Nair, and Maniyanpilla Raju in pivotal roles. The background score was composed by Rajamani.

Commissioner became the highest grossing Malayalam film of 1994, which earned Suresh Gopi as the status as an Action Superstar. It is a cult film among Keralite audiences, with several dialogues from the film became very famous. The Telugu dubbed version Police Commissioner was also a major commercial success.

The sequel titled Bharath Chandran I.P.S. was released in 2005, directed by Ranji Panicker. In 2012, a crossover film titled The King & the Commissioner, with the characters from The King (1995), Commissioner (1994) and Bharath Chandran I.P.S. (2005) was released, but the film was panned by critics and became a box-office bomb.

Plot
Bharathchandran, an honest but brash police commissioner of 
Kozhikode, bust a gold smuggling racket at the Calicut docks where he clearly has an issue with authority, and breaths fire each time he encounters a political arm bender like Kunju Moideen Sahib, whose gang was involved in the bust, but his mentor I.G.  Balachandran evidently shields him from the wrath of the political brass. 

Mohan Thomas is a Delhi-based business tycoon, with strong political clout and a clear sociopathic agenda, who had entrusted Sahib with the gold, which was confiscated by Bharathchandran. Along with gold smuggling, Mohan Thomas is also the leading kingpin of an unholy nexus of politicians, assassins and various officials, including two high ranking cops, I.G. Rajan Felix, Vigilance and A.I.G. Menon, who are involved in criminal activities like instigating communal riots, money laundering, illegal drug trade and large scale distribution of counterfeit money. Bharathchandran and Mohan Thomas are set on a collision course when Mohan and Co. brutally murder Justice Mahendran, chairman of the Poovanthura commission, possessing evidence that could potentially incriminate Rajan Felix and Menon, for their direct involvement in communal riots at Poovanthura. 

Bharathchandran is not only assigned to investigate the homicide but also posted as the police commissioner of Thiruvananthapuram city. Assisted by two dynamic, but brash ASPs Prasad Menon and Mohammed Iqbal, Bharathchandran tries to solve the mystery, but soon to hit a dead-end. Bharathchandran's fiancée Indu, a lawyer, tips him off about the news clip on an assault on a drunk police constable Gopinathan, who also was coincidentally the security for Justice Mahendran. In an attempt to take Sunny, Mohan's younger brother, who had assaulted the constable within the college premises, results in a massive riot as well as a standoff with Rajan Felix, who tries to save Sunny by trying to take him into his custody, claiming previous charges. The only clue that is left with Bharathchandran and crew are based on Vattapara Pithamparan, a trade union leader, who tips-off that Sunny had actually attacked Gopinath because of Gopinath's comment on counterfeit currency. 

With this vital clue, Bharathchandran unearths more dirt on Mohan Thomas & Co. Further, Bharathchandran arrests Srilatha Varma, Mohan's legal advisor and mistress, but is brutally murdered in a hotel elevator by Wilfred Vincent Baston, a Goa-based hitman, who had also murdered Justice Mahendran. Bharathchandran is successful in nabbing Antony Ignatius Pimento, Wilfred's right-hand man, and zeroes in on Wilfred. Bharathchandran stages a coup by arresting both Rajan Felix and Menon, who are brutally tortured to reveal details on their alliance with Mohan Thomas and also sheds light on their agenda. Iqbal is killed brutally in an attempt to arrest Wilfred Vincent Baston. This enrages Bharathchandran, who later brutally kills Wilfred and Mohan Thomas at an outhouse by torching the whole house, thus taking the law into his own hands.

Cast 
 Suresh Gopi as City Police Commissioner Bharathchandran IPS
 Ratheesh as Mohan Thomas, Rajya Sabha MP
 Shobhana as Adv. Indhu Kurup
 K. B. Ganesh Kumar as ASP Prasad IPS
 Vijayaraghavan as ASP Muhammad Iqbal IPS
 M. G. Soman as IG Balachandran Nair IPS
 Rajan P. Dev as IG Rajan Felix IPS, State IB Chief
 Bheeman Raghu as Wilfred Vincent Bastin
 N. F. Varghese as AIG Harikrishnan Menon IPS
 Baiju as Sunny Thomas
 Karamana Janardanan Nair as Justice Mahendran
 Chithra as Advocate Sreelatha Varma
 Ravi Vallathol as K.M. Varghese, Central Minister
 Ragini as Achamma Varghese
 Maniyanpilla Raju as Constable Gopinathan
 Augustine as Vattappara Peethambaran
 Priyanka Anoop as Susheela, Gopi's wife
 Kollam Thulasi as Peethambaran, Home Minister of Kerala
 Thikkurissy Sukumaran Nair	as Kunjurama Kurup
 Sathaar as Rural SP Bobby IPS
 K.P.A.C. Sunny as Kunju Moideen Sahib
 Sadiq as Sugunan
 Ranji Panicker as Journalist Gopakumar
 Biju Pappan as Goonda
 T.S.Krishnan as Henchman

Production 
Most of the film was shot extensively in and around Kozhikode and its outskirts. Most of the scenes were shot in the same locations as that of Ekalavyan (1993).

Release
Commissioner was released on April 1994 coinciding the Vishu festival and was a commercial success, where it broke several records. The film remains an iconic film in Suresh Gopi's career with its audio track and dialogues being high on demand. It also received an A certificate from the Regional Censor board for violence and profanity.

Reception
The film became the highest grossing Malayalam film of 1994. Due to the box office success, the film was soon dubbed into Tamil and Telugu as well. Both these versions went on to become top grosser to the surprise of their distributors. The Telugu version titled Police Commissioner was the most successful among the two. It ran successfully for more than 365 days in theaters across Andhra Pradesh. The Telugu version became a success even in Karnataka. 

Ashish Rajadhyaksha and Paul Willemen in the book Encyclopedia of Indian Cinema wrote "Suresh Gopi’s performance, embodying the fascist machismo of the honest and committed police officer, made him a Malayalam superstar."

Legacy and Sequels
The characters Bharathchandran IPS and Mohan Thomas portrayed by Suresh Gopi and Ratheesh are considered to be the most iconic characters in Malayalam film industry. A sequel to this film, Bharathchandran I.P.S., was released in 2005, directed by Renji Panicker himself, which was also a commercial success. A crossover film titled The King & the Commissioner was released in 2012, but was declared a box-office bomb.

References

External links

1995 films
1990s Malayalam-language films
1994 action thriller films
1994 films
1990s crime action films
1994 crime thriller films
TheKingCommi1
Films directed by Shaji Kailas
Indian crime action films
Indian crime thriller films
Indian action thriller films
Fictional portrayals of the Kerala Police
Counterfeit money in film
Films shot in Thiruvananthapuram